FKN may refer to:
 Florida Knowledge Network, a defunct American television network
 Franklin Municipal–John Beverly Rose Airport, in Virginia, United States
 Frankston railway station, in Victoria, Australia